Sir Henry Harpur, 6th Baronet (1739 – 10 February 1789) was an English Tory politician who represented the constituency of Derbyshire.

Harpur was the son of Sir Henry Harpur, 5th Baronet and Lady Caroline Manners, daughter of John Manners, 2nd Duke of Rutland. He succeeded his father to the Baronetcy in 1748. He lived at Calke Abbey, Derbyshire and 35 Upper Grosvenor Street, London.

He was returned as Member of Parliament for Derbyshire in 1761, but was replaced in a rare contested election in 1768. He served as High Sheriff of Derbyshire in 1774.

Harpur married Frances Greville, second daughter of Francis Greville, 1st Earl of Warwick and 1st Earl Brooke. in 1762. He was succeeded by his son Sir Henry Crewe, 7th Baronet.

References

 Debrett's Baronetage of England  7th Edition (1839) (Google Books)

External links
 National Portrait Gallery NPG D2572

1739 births
1789 deaths
People from South Derbyshire District
Baronets in the Baronetage of England
Members of the Parliament of Great Britain for English constituencies
High Sheriffs of Derbyshire
British MPs 1761–1768